The 2009 ICC World Cricket League Division Three was a cricket tournament that took place in Buenos Aires, Argentina, from 24 to 31 January 2009. It formed part of the ICC World Cricket League and qualifying for the 2011 Cricket World Cup.

The tournament was won by Afghanistan, with Uganda coming in second. Those teams qualified for the 2011 World Cup qualification tournament. Both won four matches and lost one, as did Papua New Guinea; the rankings tie was broken by net run rate.

Papua New Guinea were the first to reach four wins, as Afghanistan and Uganda both had their fifth matches abandoned due to rain and had to replay them the next day. The rain also resulted in the cancellation of the finals round ranking matches (which would not affect promotion or relegation in any case), and the group round result table was the final standings.

Teams

The teams for the tournament have been decided according to the results of Division Two and Division Three in 2007, and Division Four in 2008, and are as follows:

 (5th from 2007 Division Two)
 (6th from 2007 Division Two)
 (3rd from 2007 Division Three)
 (4th from 2007 Division Three)
 (1st from 2008 Division Four)
 (2nd from 2008 Division Four)

The top two teams from this tournament qualified to play in the 2009 ICC World Cup Qualifier in South Africa.

Squads

Group stage

Points table

Matches

Final and Playoffs
The playoff matches were cancelled after the abandonment of fifth-round group matches led to replays on the day the playoff matches were scheduled.

See also

ICC World Cricket League

References

World Cricket League structure

International cricket competitions in 2009
2009, 3
2009
International cricket competitions in Argentina